The 1999 Copa Perú season, the promotion tournament of Peruvian football.

The tournament has 5 stages. The first four stages are played as mini-league round-robin tournaments, except for third stage in region IV, which is played as a knockout stage. The final stage features two knockout rounds and a final four-team group stage to determine the two promoted teams.

This year 26 teams qualified for the Etapa Regional (Regional Stage): 26 champions from each department (including 2 from Lima (the capital) - Peru is politically divided in 24 Departments and 1 Constitutional Province). All these teams are divided into 8 groups by geographical proximity; then each winner qualifies for the Etapa Nacional (National Stage).

Those 8 teams will play, again by geographical proximity, home and away matches, in a knock-out tournament. The winner of the final will be promoted to the First Division

Departmental Stage
The following list shows the teams that qualified for the Regional Stage.

Regional Stage
The following list shows the teams that qualified for the Regional Stage.

Region I
Region I includes qualified teams from Amazonas, Lambayeque, Piura and Tumbes region.

Semifinals

Finals

Region II
Region II includes qualified teams from Ancash, Cajamarca and La Libertad region.

Region III
Region III includes qualified teams from Loreto, San Martín and Ucayali region.

Region IV
Region IV includes qualified teams from Callao, Ica and Lima region.

Region V
Region V includes qualified teams from Huánuco, Junín and Pasco region.

Region VI
Region VI includes qualified teams from Apurímac, Ayacucho and Huancavelica region.

Region VII
Region VII includes qualified teams from Cusco, Madre de Dios and Puno region.

Region VIII
Region VIII includes qualified teams from Arequipa, Moquegua and Tacna region.

National Stage
The National Stage started on November. The winner of the National Stage will be promoted to the First Division.

External links
 Copa Peru 1999

Copa Perú seasons
Cop